The 2022 Wisconsin State Treasurer election took place on November 8, 2022, to elect the next state treasurer of Wisconsin. Incumbent Democratic Party Treasurer Sarah Godlewski chose not to seek re-election, instead unsuccessfully running for US Senate.

Republican John Leiber defeated Democrat Aaron Richardson in the general election.

Democratic primary

Candidates

Nominee
Aaron Richardson, mayor of Fitchburg

Eliminated in primary
Gillian Battino, radiologist
Angelito Tenorio, West Allis alderman

Did not file 
Dawn Marie Sass, Green County supervisor and former State Treasurer of Wisconsin (2007–2011)

Declined
Sarah Godlewski, incumbent treasurer (''ran for U.S. Senate)

Endorsements

Polling

Results

Republican primary

Candidates

Nominee
John Leiber, attorney

Eliminated in primary 
Orlando Owens, activist and pastor

Endorsements

Results

Constitution Party primary

Candidates

Nominee
Andrew Zuelke, chairman of the Wisconsin Constitution Party

Results

General election

Results

Notes

Partisan clients

References

External links
Official campaign websites
Gillian Battino (D) for State Treasurer
Jeanette Deschene (R) for State Treasurer
John Leiber (R) for State Treasurer
Orlando Owens (R) for State Treasurer
Aaron Richardson (D) for State Treasurer
Dawn Marie Sass (D) for State Treasurer
Angelito Tenorio (D) for State Treasurer

State Treasurer
Wisconsin
Wisconsin Treasurer elections